Hugh Lawson White Hill (March 1, 1810 – January 18, 1892) was an American politician and a member of the United States House of Representatives for Tennessee's 4th congressional district.

Biography
Hill was born on March 1, 1810, in McMinnville, Tennessee, in Warren County a son of Henry John A. and Susannah Swales Hill. After attending public school and Carroll Male Academy at McMinnville, he graduated from Cumberland College in Nashville.  He taught school for a short time and engaged in agricultural pursuits and fruit growing. He married Virginia Dearing on May 14, 1840, and they had eight children.

Career
Hill was a member of the Tennessee House of Representatives from 1837 to 1839 and in 1841. He was elected as a Democrat to the Thirtieth Congress. He served from March 4, 1847, to March 3, 1849.  He was not a candidate for renomination in 1848.

Hill resumed agricultural pursuits and was a member of the state constitutional convention in 1870.

Death
Hill died at Hills Creek in Warren County, Tennessee, on January 18, 1892, and was interred in Hill Graveyard near McMinnville, Tennessee. He was a cousin of fellow congressman Benjamin Harvey Hill.

References

External links

1810 births
1892 deaths
Democratic Party members of the Tennessee House of Representatives
Democratic Party members of the United States House of Representatives from Tennessee
19th-century American politicians
People from McMinnville, Tennessee